Aligrudić is a surname originally from Montenegro. Notable people with the surname include:

Miloš Aligrudić (born 1964), Serbian politician and lawyer, son of Slobodan
Slobodan Aligrudić (1934–1985), Serbian actor

Serbian surnames